Jai is a 2004 Telugu-language drama film directed by Teja, starring Navdeep in his debut, and also has Santhoshi and Ayesha Jhulka. The film was dubbed in Tamil as Jairam. The film was successful in both the languages. The story tries to marry romance and patriotism.

Plot
Jairam is a son of a rich widow whose husband was killed by the Pakistanis in the war. As usual, she neglects her son and is busy in earning money for him in the business. Jai is a brilliant student who possesses high moral values. He falls in love with Farah, whose father teaches him boxing. Jai's mother holds the Indo-Pak Boxing Match. India loses the match, and the Pakistan champion challenges Indians saying that even after 56 years of independence, Indians cannot stop Pakistanis from butchering the Indian army members. Jai challenges that he will win them in 56 days. The twist in the tale is that the Pakistani boxer is none other than the ISI member sent by Lashkar-e-Taiba Chief Maulana Masood Azhar. When young Jai challenges them, he started his training and he gained punch weight up to 75kgs which was high compared to his opponent, then Pakistanis started trouble with Jai when he's upon training they rushed into fight and thrown stone to Jai's chest and crushed his right hand by their knee, Afterwards, Jai got rescued and admitted to hospital. The doctor reports that his ligament got teared and ribs got fractured and it caused Pneumothorax which it leads against boxing challenge to put him on hospital for 6 months. But Jai doesn't want to give up and started testing himself by punching the pillow but it caused his hand teared severely and blood was dropping from his hand. After, doctor warns him if he does like that again it leads to lose his hand. So he started his training by using only his left hand. But Pakistanis also troubled his trainer and he got admitted but his son was ready to train him instead of his father. After 15 days, he attends the boxing match but got hit to his chest and it leads getting points to Pakistan but Jai never give up and started punching even by using his right hand which was injured when it bleeds he doesn't care about it and started punching his opponent. After his opponent got knocked, blood is shown dripping from his ear, showing that Jai defeated him with his broken fist chanting 'Vande Mataram'. After India won the boxing challenge and proved that they defeated Pakistan.

Cast

Navdeep as Jairam
Santhoshi as Farah
Ayesha Jhulka as Jai's mother
Tanikella Bharani
Abhinayashree
Venu Madhav
Duvvasi Mohan
Dhanraj
Allu Ramalingaiah
Jenny

 Tamil version
Pandiarajan as Sachin Undulkar, the school principal
Chinni Jayanth as Auto driver
Madhan Bob

Release
Jai was director Teja's released in Telugu and Tamil simultaneously in 900 theaters worldwide including India, Singapore, UK, USA and Australia. The Tamil version, Jairam, was produced by Radaan Media Works, owned by veteran actress, Radhika. Senior actors in Tamil replaced the senior actors in Telugu in the Tamil Version to bring in nativity while most scenes were left dubbed from the original. The movie made good business in Tamil Nadu and was the first major film production for Radaan Mediaworks.

Soundtrack
The music was composed By Anup Rubens and released by Sohan Audio. All lyrics were penned by Kulasekhar.

Tamil Track list
"Dama Dama" - Shankar Mahadevan
"Chinna Nenjile" - Sumangali
"Oh Manase" - S. P. B. Charan
"Vande Matharam" - Baby Vaishali, Harish Raghavendra
"Un Kaiyil" - Sujatha Mohan
"Kannin Maniye" - Malliga Arun & K. S. Chithra
"Suruttamma" - Anuradha Sriram & Manikka Vinayagam
"Music Bit" - Anoop Rubens

Reception
The movie was successful at the box office. The film's music was a hit; songs like Desam Manade went on to become chart-busters.

References

External links
 
 

2000s Telugu-language films
2004 films
India–Pakistan relations in popular culture
Indian romantic drama films
Films directed by Teja (film director)
Indian interfaith romance films
Indian multilingual films
2004 multilingual films
2004 romantic drama films